FK506 binding protein 5, also known as FKBP5, is a protein which in humans is encoded by the FKBP5 gene.

Function 

The protein encoded by this gene is a member of the immunophilin protein family, which play a role in immunoregulation and basic cellular processes involving protein folding and trafficking. This encoded protein is a cis-trans prolyl isomerase that binds to the immunosuppressants tacrolimus (FK506) and sirolimus (rapamycin). It is thought to mediate calcineurin inhibition. It also interacts functionally with mature corticoid receptor hetero-complexes  (i.e. progesterone-, glucocorticoid-, mineralocorticoid-receptor complexes) along with the 90 kDa heat shock protein and PTGES3 (P23 protein).

As an Hsp90-associated co-chaperone that regulates the responsiveness of steroid hormone receptors, FKBP51 plays an important role in stress endocrinology and glucocorticoid signaling.

Clinical significance 
The FKBP5 gene has been found to have multiple polyadenylation sites and is statistically associated with a higher rate of depressive disorders.

Decreased methylation in the promoter of the FKBP5 gene has been observed in blood samples from patients with neurodegenerative diseases.

FKBP51 Ligands 
As a key player in several diseases like stress-related disorders, chronic pain, and obesity, FKBP51 is an attractive drug target. SAFit2 currently the most best characterized FKBP51 ligand, has shown promising effects in numerous animal models.  Macrocyclic FKBP51-selective ligands are non-immunosuppressive, engage FKBP51 in cells, and block the cellular effect of FKBP51.

Interactions 

FKBP5 has been shown to interact with Heat shock protein 90kDa alpha (cytosolic), member A1.

See also 
 FKBP4 - a functional antagonist to FKBP5 at corticoid receptors
 FKBP3 - a DNA binding FKBP

References

Further reading 

 
 
 
 
 
 
 
 
 
 
 
 
 
 
 
 
 
 

EC 5.2.1